Carver is a 2008 horror film directed by Franklin Guerrero Jr., and stars Matt Carmody, Neil Kubath, and Erik Fones. It was filmed on location in and around Woodbridge, Virginia.

Plot
A group of young campers take a detour through the mountain town of Halcyon Ridge, and stop at a bar where the owner asks them for help getting supplies from their storehouse in the woods. When they get there, they discover bizarre snuff films which, unbeknownst to them, are real. They soon become the targets of two homicidal brothers with an insatiable bloodlust.

References

External links 
 
 

2008 films
2008 horror films
American horror films
Films about snuff films
Films shot in Virginia
2000s English-language films
2000s American films